R v Lovelass and Others (1834) 172 ER 1380 is a formative case in the history of UK labour law. It saw the Tolpuddle Martyrs, farm workers who wished to form a union to prevent wage cuts, convicted and deported to Australia. It triggered protests which led to the workers' eventual release and return to Britain.

Facts
In Tolpuddle, a village in Dorset, George Lovelass (also spelled "Loveless" in a different report of the trial, and sometimes "Lovelace") and James Lovelass, James Brine, James Hammett, and John Standfield, had met in Thomas Standfield’s house, and had taken an oath to combine to attempt to raise wages for agricultural workers. They formed the Friendly Society of Agricultural Labourers. A witness, Edward Legg, had also taken the oath which included an undertaking to reveal nothing. Under the Unlawful Oaths Act 1797, passed in response to naval mutinies following the French Revolution, it was illegal to make an oath, and a further offence to not reveal the oath.

Lock (also spelled as Lark in the case report) gave evidence as a witness. Edward Legg as a witness said the following.

Counsel for the defence argued that the purpose of the 1797 Act was to target mutiny and sedition, to break allegiance to the King. Associations to raise wages should no longer be illegal. The lodges of Freemasons were no different. Therefore, the Tolpuddle labourers had done nothing unlawful.

Judgment
Williams B gave the following directions to the jury, that the 1797 Act was essentially applicable to the labourers attempt to combine.

The jury returned a verdict of guilty, that oaths were taken, and further oaths taken not to disclose the oaths. The prisoners were then to be deported to Australia.

Significance

The case triggered a swell of protest. 800,000 signatures were collected for the Tolpuddle labourers, soon to be known as the Tolpuddle Martyrs, to be released. Eventually, in 1837, the Home Secretary did release them and returned them to Britain.

A Tolpuddle Martyrs' Festival and Rally is held annually in Tolpuddle, usually in the third week of July, organised by the Trades Union Congress.

See also

UK labour law
Commonwealth v. Hunt, 45 Mass. 111 (1842)

Notes

References
S Webb and B Webb, The History of Trade Unionism (1920) ch 3
E McGaughey, A Casebook on Labour Law (Hart 2018) ch 1

United Kingdom labour case law
1834 in case law
1834 in British law